Sabumon Abdusamad, also known mononymously as Sabu, is an Indian actor and television presenter who works in Malayalam cinema. He was the winner of the first season of Bigg Boss.

Personal life
Sabu hails from Kayamkulam, Alappuzha. He holds three graduate degrees, in Malayalam,  Journalism and in Law respectively from University College, Trivandrum. He initially worked in the sales and operations division of Lufthansa Airlines in Saudi Arabia. Later, he quit the job and decided to pursue his passion for acting. He is the chief executive officer of SAB productions company. He is married to Sneha Bhaskaran and has two daughters.

Career
Sabu initially achieved success through the TV show Tharikida, which focused on pranks on unsuspecting people. Due to the success of the show, people started addressing him as Tharikida Sabu. Sabu continued to do television shows, and his role as an interviewer in the TV show Midukki was widely appreciated.

Sabu was the thirteenth contestant in Bigg Boss, a show hosted by Malayalam actor Mohanlal. He lasted the entire duration of the 98-day show and went on to win the title, beating competition from Pearle Maaney, Shiyas Kareem, Srinish Aravind and Aristo Suresh in the grand finale.

Sabu also owns a production company, SAB Productions.

Television

Filmography

All films are in Malayalam language unless otherwise noted.

References

External links
 

1972 births
Living people
Male actors in Malayalam cinema
Indian male film actors
Bigg Boss Malayalam contestants
Indian television presenters
21st-century Indian male actors